State Route 84 (SR 84) is an east–west state highway in the northeastern portion of the U.S. state of Ohio.

A portion of SR 84 runs along the historic Johnnycake Ridge Road. SR 84 is not signed between US 20 and the eastern end of US 6 concurrency.

History

1926 – Extended to Willoughby Hills along a previously unnumbered road.
1931 – Truncated at Dorset; Dorset to West Andover decertified.
1935 – Rerouted from Madison to Ashtabula along the previous State Route 307 alignment (which was unnumbered before 1933); former alignment from south of Madison to Dorset certified as State Route 307.
1938 – Extended to Pennsylvania state line along the former alignment of State Route 83 from Ashtabula to Kelloggsville (which was unnumbered before 1926), and along a previously unnumbered road from Kelloggsville to the state line.

Major junctions

References

084
Transportation in Ashtabula County, Ohio
Transportation in Cuyahoga County, Ohio
Transportation in Lake County, Ohio